Kidsgrove Secondary School is a coeducational secondary school located in Kidsgrove in the English county of Staffordshire.

It was originally known as Maryhill High School before converting to academy status in June 2013. The school was then renamed University Academy Kidsgrove, sponsored by the University of Chester Academies Trust. In 2018 the school was taken over by the Shaw Education Trust after the University of Chester Academies Trust experienced financial difficulties. The school was then renamed Kidsgrove Secondary School after a ballot of the local area. In 2020 the school had a £500,000 refurbishment.

Kidsgrove Secondary School offers GCSEs and BTECS as programmes of study for pupils, with some courses offered in conjunction with Madeley High School. The school also operates The Duke of Edinburgh's Award scheme.

References

External links 
Kidsgrove Secondary School official website

Secondary schools in Staffordshire
Kidsgrove
Academies in Staffordshire
Shaw Education Trust